The International Business Law Consortium (IBLC) describes itself as an affiliation of independent law firms, tax and audit advisors and related professionals cultivating transnational legal knowledge to promote efficient and effective professional services and guide businesses in a global community.

The IBLC was established in 1996 under the auspices of the Center for International Legal Studies as a means of assisting law firms affiliated with the Center to participate in and further the Center's programs, and to translate these benefits to the delivery of transnational legal services. The former aim is promoted by members' participation in the Center's research projects and the extension of special terms for their participation in its legal education and professional development programs. The IBLC offers members international business contacts and a platform from which to manage transnational business law knowledge and know how. It helps them to develop the most effective mechanisms for serving international business community. IBLC seeks to limit its membership to firms of impeccable professional reputation. In 2006, more than 100 firms in Europe, North, Central, and South America, Asia and the Pacific, and the Middle East were members of the IBLC. The IBLC stresses that it is not a network in the conventional sense, but its members collaborate to provide global reach and local expertise for their clients.

References

External links 
 International Business Law Consortium 

International law organizations
International organisations based in Austria